Chervonyi Khutir is the terminus station of the Kyiv Metro's Syretsko-Pecherska Line. It opened on 23 May 2008. The station's name arises from an old village "Chervonyi Khutir" that was subsequently absorbed into Kyiv city limits and is now an industrial neighbourhood.
The station is located amidst a woodland and at first was unlikely to have any passengers at all. However, there is currently a much greater need for the station because it is right next Kyiv's third depot, Kharkivske, which has been a much-needed acquisition to the line since the mid-1990s, yet due to financial difficulties caused by recessions, construction only began in 2004.

Chervonyi Khutir is also part of much larger plan to have the line snake around the south-eastern districts of Kyiv and then come back up north-westwards towards the new Darnytsia Railway Station and the Darnytsia metro station of the Sviatoshynsko-Brovarska Line. In the meantime, the surrounding area will be redeveloped and new housing massivs would justify the station.

Construction
Chervonyi Khutir's layout is a pillar bi-span with side platforms, chosen out of simplicity and ease of construction. Its main theme would be a light tone and focused on the surrounding nature. The walls and central row of pillars are faced with bright beige and yellow marble and the ceiling with fiberglass.

The station uses a number of solutions for people with disabilities. The safety line at the edge of the platform is made of yellow ceramic tactile tiles, which allows people with visual impairments to navigate better. The station has nine elevators from the level of the platform to the level of the cash hall and from the underpass to the surface.

History
Construction began in 2005 after the opening of Boryspilska station. In April 2007, Kyiv Mayor Leonid Chernovetskyi stated that construction of the station should be suspended due to possible low passenger traffic, as the station is located on the outskirts of the city and "animals do not ride the subway". But later, when an early mayoral election was scheduled for May 25 , 2008, it was decided to open it two days before the election. The station was opened on May 23, 2008.

Location
In fact, this is the only station of the Kyiv metro, located not in a residential area, but in the woods. Kharkiv Electric Depot and the end stations of several buses are located nearby. This provides a small but stable passenger flow. In future, it is planned to extend the Syretsko-Pecherska line to Darnytsia railway station (under construction).

Work schedule
Opening - 5:52, closing - 23:57

Departure of the first train in the direction of:

Syrets - 5:57

Departure of the last train in the direction of:

Syrets - 0:00

Train schedule in the evening (after 22:00) in the direction of:

Syrets - 22:06, 22:18, 22:29, 22:41, 22:53, 23:05, 23:16, 23:27, 23:38, 23:49

Gallery

References

External links

 Photographs of station's construction 
 Opening of the station 

Kyiv Metro stations
Railway stations opened in 2008
2008 establishments in Ukraine